The TOSHIBA 2012 Chinese FA Cup (Chinese: 东芝2012中国足球协会杯) was the 14th edition of the Chinese FA Cup. The first round matches began on 26 May 2012, and the finals took place on 10 November and 18 November 2012.

The cup title sponsor was Japanese company Toshiba.

Participants

Chinese Super League
Total 16 teams took part in 2012 CFA Cup.

 Beijing Guoan
 Changchun Yatai
 Dalian Aerbin
 Dalian Shide
 Guangzhou Evergrande
 Guangzhou R&F
 Guizhou Renhe
 Hangzhou Greentown
 Henan Jianye
 Jiangsu Sainty
 Liaoning Whowin
 Qingdao Jonoon
 Shandong Luneng Taishan
 Shanghai Shenhua
 Shanghai Shenxin
 Tianjin Teda TH

China League One
Total 16 teams took part in 2012 CFA Cup.

 Beijing BIT
 Beijing Baxy
 Chengdu Blades
 Chongqing FC
 Chongqing Lifan
 Fujian Smart Hero
 Guangdong Sunray Cave
 Harbin Yiteng
 Hohhot Dongjin
 Hunan Billows
 Shanghai East Asia
 Shenyang Shenbei
 Shenzhen Ruby
 Tianjin Songjiang
 Wuhan Zall
 Yanbian Baekdu Tigers

China League Two & amateur team
16 teams from 2012 China League Two, 2011 China Amateur Football League Final stage, Chinese Collegiate Football League and the Vision China Championship were selected to take part in 2012 CFA Cup.

Guizhou Zhicheng (League Two)
Dongguan Nancheng (League Two)
Shandong Youth (League Two)
Shanghai Zobon (League Two)
Hebei Zhongji (League Two)
Guangdong Youth (League Two)
Shaanxi Laochenggen (League Two)
Hubei Youth (League Two)
Dalian Longjuanfeng (Amateur League)
Changchun Fengyun (Amateur League)
Wuhan Dongfeng Honda (Amateur League)
Hebei Yingli (Amateur League)
Shanxi Jiayi1 (League Two/Collegiate League)
Tongji University (Collegiate League)
Wuhan Hongxing (Vision China Championship)
Zibo Sunday (Vision China Championship)

Note 1: Reorganized by Taiyuan University of Technology

Schedule

Results
Times listed are UTC+8

First round

Second round

Third round

Fourth round

Quarter-finals

Semi-finals

First leg

Second leg

Final

First leg

Assistant referees:
 Ashley Beecham (Australia)
 Nathan MacDonald (Australia)
Fourth official:
Yao Qing

Second leg

Assistant referees:
 Kim Sung-Il  (Korea Republic)
 Ji Seung-Min (Korea Republic)
Fourth official:
Wang Di

Awards
 Top Scorer:  Rafa Jordà (Guizhou Renhe)
 Most Valuable Player:  Lucas Barrios (Guangzhou Evergrande)
 Fair Play Award: Shandong Luneng Taishan
 Best Manager:  Marcello Lippi (Guangzhou Evergrande)

Goal scorers
6 goals
  Rafa Jordà (Guizhou Moutai)

5 goals
  Adriano (Dalian Shide)

3 goals
  Lucas Barrios (Guangzhou Evergrande)
  Cai Xinyu (Hubei Youth)
  Wang Yongpo (Shandong Luneng)

2 goals

  Matías Alonso (Beijing BIT)
  Joffre Guerrón (Beijing Guoan)
  Frédéric Kanouté (Beijing Guoan)
  Xu Liang (Beijing Guoan)
  Wang Xiaolong (Beijing Guoan)
  Marko Ljubinković (Changchun Yatai)
  Hu Zhaojun (Dalian Aerbin)
  Zhang Chenlong (Dongguan Nancheng)
  Fan Qunxiao (Guangdong Sunray Cave)
  Chen Qi (Guangdong Youth)
  Cui Ning (Guangdong Youth)
  Davi (Guangzhou R&F)
  Gao Yunfei (Hebei Zhongji)
  Miloš Trifunović (Liaoning Whowin)
  Yang Xu (Liaoning Whowin)
  Yu Hanchao (Liaoning Whowin)
  Sha Yibo (Qingdao Jonoon)
  Zhang Hao (Hohhot Dongjin)
  Lü Zheng (Shandong Luneng)
  Du Yuxin (Shandong Youth)

1 goal

  Chen Hao-wei (Beijing Baxy)
  Wang Chao (Beijing BIT) 
  Gao Xiang (Chengdu Blades)
  Wang Cun (Chengdu Blades)
  Yang Hao (Chengdu Blades)
  Guo Mingyue (Chongqing F.C.) 
  Li Fei (Chongqing F.C.) 
  Du Wenxiang (Chongqing Lifan)
  Wang Hongliang (Chongqing Lifan)
  Lee Addy (Dalian Aerbin) 
  Zhou Tong (Dalian Aerbin) 
  Martin Kamburov (Dalian Shide)
  Lü Peng (Dalian Shide)
  Park Dong-Hyuk (Dalian Shide)
  Liao Lisheng (Dongguan Nancheng)
  Zhang Xingbo (Dongguan Nancheng)
  Zhao Huang (Guangdong Sunray Cave)
  Chang Feiya (Guangdong Youth)
  Luo Boxing (Guangdong Youth)
  Cléo (Guangzhou Evergrande)
  Darío Conca (Guangzhou Evergrande)
  Jiang Ning (Guangzhou Evergrande)
  Li Jianhua (Guangzhou Evergrande)
  Wu Pingfeng (Guangzhou Evergrande)
  Zhang Linpeng (Guangzhou Evergrande)
  Zhao Xuri (Guangzhou Evergrande)
  Zheng Zhi (Guangzhou Evergrande)
  Yakubu (Guangzhou R&F)
  Lu Lin (Guangzhou R&F)
  Wu Wei'an (Guangzhou R&F) 
  Dino Djulbic (Guizhou Moutai)
  Zlatan Muslimović (Guizhou Moutai)
  Qu Bo (Guizhou Moutai)
  Rao Weihui (Guizhou Moutai)
  Shen Tianfeng (Guizhou Moutai)
  Rubén Suárez (Guizhou Moutai)
  Yu Hai (Guizhou Moutai)
  Zhang Chenglin (Guizhou Moutai)
  Gu Zhongqing (Guizhou Zhicheng)
  Ilhamjan Iminjan (Guizhou Zhicheng)
  Jiang Liang (Guizhou Zhicheng)
  Sun Xiaokun (Guizhou Zhicheng)
  Yang Meiyuan (Guizhou Zhicheng)
  Chen Zhongliu (Hangzhou Greentown)
  Fabrício (Hangzhou Greentown)
  Feng Gang (Hangzhou Greentown)
  Xie Pengfei (Hangzhou Greentown)
  Wang Song (Hangzhou Greentown)
  Godfred Karikari (Henan Jianye)
  Christopher Katongo (Henan Jianye)
  Wang Jia'nan (Henan Jianye)
  Li Duanhao (Hubei Youth)
  Bai Yuexuan (Hunan Liuyanghe)
  Claudio Cardozo (Hunan Liuyanghe)
  Cheng Peng (Hunan Liuyanghe)
  Ji Xiang (Jiangsu Sainty)
  Zhao Junzhe (Liaoning Whowin)
  Pang Zhiquan (Qingdao Jonoon)
  Song Wenjie (Qingdao Jonoon)
  José Ortigoza (Shandong Luneng)
  Simão (Shandong Luneng)
  Wang Qiang (Shandong Luneng)
  Yang Chen (Shandong Luneng)
  Yang Kuo (Shandong Youth)
  Jiang Xiaochen (Shanghai Shenxin)
  Zhu Jiawei (Shanghai Shenxin)
  Samir Arzú (Shanghai Tellace)
  Chen Zijie (Shanghai Tellace)
  Fu Huan (Shanghai Tellace)
  Geng Jiaqi (Shanghai Tellace)
  Mao Jiakang (Shanghai Tellace)
  Wang Jiajie (Shanghai Tellace)
  Hou Junjie (Shanghai Zobon)
  Ji Xiaoxuan (Shanghai Zobon)
  Li Haowen (Shanghai Zobon)
  Pei Siyuan (Shanxi Jiayi)
  Chen Xing (Shenyang Shenbei)
  Liu Le (Shenyang Shenbei)
  Tian Yinong (Shenyang Shenbei)
  Vladimir Vujović (Shenyang Shenbei)
  Du longquan (Shenzhen Ruby)
  Babacar Gueye (Shenzhen Ruby)
  Mao Biao (Tianjin Teda)
  Yang Chungang (Tongji University)
  Chen Hao (Wuhan Hongxing)
  Huang Lei (Wuhan Hongxing)
  Qi Chongxi (Wuhan Hongxing)
  Zhang Weijun (Wuhan Hongxing)
  Tan Si (Wuhan Zall)
  Gao Wanguo (Yanbian Baekdu Tigers)
  Han Guanghua (Yanbian Baekdu Tigers)

Own goals
 Scored for Beijing Guoan (1):  Liu Yangyang (Qingdao Jonoon)
 Scored for Guangzhou R&F (1):  Chen Zhen (Hunan Liuyanghe)

References

External links
Official Website
2012 Chinese FA Cup at Sina

2012
2012 in Chinese football
2012 domestic association football cups
Guangzhou F.C. matches